He's Keith Murray is the fourth album by rapper Keith Murray and his first and only released by Def Jam. It was critically and commercially well received. It included the smash single "Yeah Yeah U Know It".

Track listing

Samples
Candi Bar
"Havana Candy" by Patti Austin
Child of the Streets (Man Child)
"Child of the Streets" by Sam Dees
Christina
"Mother Nature" by The Temptations
Yeah Yeah U Know
"The Show" by Doug E. Fresh

Album chart positions

Singles chart positions

References

2003 albums
Keith Murray (rapper) albums
Albums produced by Pete Rock
Albums produced by Erick Sermon
Albums produced by Just Blaze
Albums produced by Jazze Pha
Albums produced by Clark Kent (producer)
Albums produced by Rockwilder
Albums produced by DJ Khalil